Since 1928, the Far Eastern University has seen graduates pass through its halls. From politics, media, business, entertainment, to sports, a number of Tamaraws have made their mark in various fields. This list includes prominent alumni of the Far Eastern University.

Green and Gold Awards 
Held every five years, the Green and Gold Awards signifies FEU’s unwavering and continuing commitment to the cause of education. It includes three major citations which encompass the university’s key strengths as an institution: academics, culture, and sports.

Governance and public service

Business

Media

Sports

Arts and culture 
 Edwin Cordevilla - poet and journalist
 Ligaya Fernando-Amilbangsa -  cultural researcher, educator, artist and  Ramon Magsaysay Awardee
 Alejandro Roces - author, essayist, dramatist and a National Artist of the Philippines for Literature
 Azucena Grajo Uranza - Novelist and playwright
Antonio S. Cua - scholar and author
 Clodualdo del Mundo Sr. - novelist, playwright, essayist, journalist, writer, teacher and critic
 Lina Espina-Moore - writer and S.E.A. Write Awardee
HaveYouSeenThisGirL - author
Jon Jaylo - painter
Nonoy Marcelo - famous cartoonist
 F. Sionil José - writer, National Artist of the Philippines for Literature

Medicine 
 Randy Dellosa -  Filipino psychologist and psychotherapist
 Saffrullah Dipatuan - doctor and head of the Ministry of Health of Bangsamoro

References

External links 

 Official website of the FEU Alumni Relations Office
 Official website of the Far Eastern University

Far Eastern University alumni
FEU
Far Eastern University
Lists of people by university or college in Manila